Dry Fork is a stream in Crawford, Dent and Phelps counties in the Ozarks of Missouri. It is a tributary of the Meramec River.

Dry Fork was named for the fact it frequently runs dry.

See also
List of rivers of Missouri

References

Rivers of Crawford County, Missouri
Rivers of Dent County, Missouri
Rivers of Phelps County, Missouri
Rivers of Missouri
Tributaries of the Meramec River